Southern California Seahorses are an American soccer team based in La Mirada, California. Founded in 2001, the team plays in USL League Two, the fourth tier of the American Soccer Pyramid.

The team plays its home games in the stadium on the campus of Whittier College. The team's colors are navy blue, white and orange.

The Seahorses are a division of Missionary Athletes International (MAI), an organization which undertakes sports ministry to share the message of Christianity through the environment of soccer. They are a sister organization of the Charlotte Eagles in USL League Two.

History
The Seahorses, which had previously been in existence as a youth soccer club since 1983, joined the PDL in 2001, and were successful immediately, finishing second to Orange County Blue Star in their debut season with an impressive 13–6–1 record. 2002 continued the trend, when the Seahorses again finished second in the Southwest Division, this time behind Chico Rooks, with an 11–7–0 record. Their first trip to the playoffs was also a successful one, when they beat Spokane Shadow and Cascade Surge to advanced to the national final four, where they were defeated in the semi-finals by Boulder Rapids Reserve.

The Seahorses missed the playoffs in 2003, finishing third behind divisional champions Fresno Fuego, and just missed out again in 2004, finishing third behind Orange County Blue Star, despite posting some impressive victories in the regular season, including 4–1 defeat of Nevada Wonders and a 5–1 demolition of San Diego Gauchos.

The developing rivalry between the Seahorses and Orange County Blue Star continued in 2005, when yet again the men from La Mirada finished a close second to their all-conquering Southland neighbors in the Southwest Division standings. The Seahorses began the season with a 5-game winning streak that included a 3–0 trouncing of California Gold; however, they did not manage defeat – or even score a goal on – their rivals in their 3 games, losing 4–0, 3–0 and 3–0 to the eventual divisional champs. Nevertheless, the Seahorses were clearly the next best thing in the southwest, and enjoyed several impressive wins (including a trio of 3-0s over San Diego Gauchos, Nevada Wonders and Fresno Fuego) in the second half of the season. Their trip to the playoffs was a short one, however, as the Seahorses lost to Cascade Surge first time out. Striker Anthony Stovall registered an impressive 7 goals on the season, and Dylan Martinez led the team in assists.

2006 saw the Seahorses finally capture their first divisional title, besting Orange County Blue Star by seven points at season's end. The year was one of solid consistency, and included a hugely impressive 9-game winning streak which stretched from early June to the end of July, and included two 4–0 victories (over Los Angeles Storm and California Gold), and a hard-fought finale against the San Fernando Valley Quakes. However, for the second year in a row, the Seahorses' playoff excursion ended quickly with a 2–1 defeat to BYU Cougars. MLS-bound striker Josh Hansen scored an impressive 8 goals and 4 assists on the season, closely followed by Romanian import Cristian Rus with 6. Keeper Eric Reed enjoyed the best goalkeeping statistics in the PDL, with a goals-against average of 0.621 per game, and keeping 10 clean sheets in his 15 games.

However, much like their crosstown rivals Blue Star, everything went wrong for the Seahorses in 2007. With Eric Reed having gone to new USL-1 franchise California Victory, the Seahorses defence became incredibly leaky; the team suffered four defeats in their first five games – including a chaotic 4–3 loss to the San Fernando Valley Quakes – and although things began to sure up towards the second half of the season, they found themselves unable to actually WIN any games. Five ties in their last ten games put an end to their playoff hopes early, although the team did finish with a flourish with a resounding 4–0 thrashing of Bakersfield Brigade on the final day, and eventually finished 7th. Midfielder Conan Hawkins led the scoring stats, tallying 4 goals on the season, while Chris Leiva registered 6 assists.

The downturn in form continued in 2008 for the Seahorses, who began the season with a 3–1 loss to San Fernando Valley Quakes, and then proceeded to win just one of their next eight games, a 1–0 road win over Lancaster Rattlers. To their credit, few of the Seahorses' losses were blowouts: 0–1 here, 1–2 there, but in each game their strikers never quite seemed to breach the opposition defences, or show enough sharpness in front of goal. They enjoyed their revenge over Orange County Blue Star with a 1–0 win in June, making up for a 4–1 thrashing earlier in the season, and put an end to the San Jose Frogs' playoff chances with an impressive 3–1 home victory in mid-July, but finished the year with a 5–2 hammering at the hands of Fresno Fuego, and a disappointing bottom-of-the-table clash with Lancaster Rattlers on the final day of the season which ended in a 1–1 tie and managed to keep them out of the basement spot. The Seahorses ended their season in 9th place; Chris Leiva, Diego Mejía and Cristian Rus were the joint top scorers with three goals each, while Scott Lucky led the assist stats with 2 to his name.

The Seahorses entered their ninth season in the PDL looking to recapture the form of yesteryear, but it was not to be; despite welcoming ex-pros Josiah Snelgrove and Adam Frye back into the fold, and despite posting an impressive 6–2 victory over Bakersfield Brigade in their second game of the season in which new signing Ryan Shaw netted twice, the Seahorses began to find that the story of their season would revolve around ties. The Seahorses drew eight of their sixteen regular season games, and were made to rue their matches with Fresno Fuego and Ventura County Fusion in which they conceded a 90th minute equalizing goals when they looked odds-on to win. Their last win of the season came at the beginning of July, a 2–1 away victory over the Lancaster Rattlers, and thereafter the men from La Mirada staggered to the finishing line, eventually finishing sixth in the division, eight points out of the playoffs, and missing the postseason for the third straight year. Ryan Shaw was the Seahorses' top scorer, with 6 goals.

Colors and badge

On March 1, 2018, the unveiled a new crest, as a part of a partnership with Charlotte Eagles.

Players

Notable former players
This list of notable former players comprises players who went on to play professional soccer after playing for the team in the Premier Development League, or those who previously played professionally before joining the team.

  Mark Bloom
  Tomislav Colić
  Michael Cunningham
  Adam Frye
  Josh Hansen
  Patrick Ianni
  Christopher Klotz
  Steven Lenhart
  Kiel McClung
  Diego Mejía
  Ben Page
  Eric Reed
  Gregg Schroeder
  Josiah Snelgrove
  Anthony Stovall
  Brent Whitfield

Year-by-year

Honors
 USL PDL Southwest Division Champions 2006
 USL PDL Western Conference Champions 2002

Head coaches
  Todd Elkins (2005–2013)
  Johnny Juarez-Jackman (2013–2015)
  Joe Lurker (2015–present)

Stadia
 Stadium at La Habra High School; La Habra, California (2003–2004)
 Al Barbour Field; La Mirada, California (2004–present)

Average attendance
 2005: 300
 2006: 279
 2007: 263
 2008: 328
 2009: 277
 2010: 233
 2011: 150
 2012: 223
 2013: 200
 2014: 198
 2015: 176

References

External links
Official Site
Official PDL site
Missionary Athletes International

Soccer clubs in Greater Los Angeles
Sports in Los Angeles County, California
La Mirada, California
USL League Two teams
Charlotte Eagles
1983 establishments in California
Association football clubs established in 1983
Christian sports organizations